Danny Lee Jesus "D. J." Fluker (born March 13, 1991) is an American football offensive tackle who is a free agent. He was drafted by the San Diego Chargers in the first round of the 2013 NFL Draft. He played college football at Alabama, where he was recognized as an All-American.

High school career
Born and raised in the Lower Ninth Ward of New Orleans, Louisiana, Fluker and his family left the city in the final hours before Hurricane Katrina roared ashore. They moved to Biloxi, Mississippi, and later Mobile, Alabama, where Fluker attended McGill-Toolen Catholic High School. By eighth grade, he stood 6'3" and weighed 400 pounds, but later lost much of that weight. At McGill-Toolen, Fluker was a dominating defensive lineman. Family issues took Fluker back to Biloxi, for his junior year, where he remained at defensive tackle, after almost giving up on his football career.

Prior to his senior year, Fluker moved back to Alabama—this time to the city of Foley. At Foley High School, head coach Todd Watson convinced Fluker to play on the offensive line to exploit his full potential. Foley finished the season with a 7–3 record, including a 24–17 win over Fluker's old McGill-Toolen team. Fluker earned high school All-American honors from USA Today, Parade, EA Sports, and SuperPrep. He also received an invitation to the 2009 U.S. Army All-American Bowl.

In addition to football, Fluker was also a member of the Foley track & field team, where he threw the shot put, recording a top-throw of 16.27 meters (53 ft 1 in) at the 2009 Mobile Challenge, where he took 4th.

Considered a five-star recruit by Rivals.com, Fluker was ranked No. 1 among offensive tackle prospects in the nation. Despite growing up an LSU Tigers fan, Fluker committed to Alabama.

College career

Fluker enrolled in the University of Alabama, where he was a member of coach Nick Saban's Alabama Crimson Tide football team from 2009 to 2012.  Projected to play as true freshman at Alabama, he was a candidate to replace All-American Andre Smith at left tackle, although junior college transfer James Carpenter was considered to have better chances, and eventually got the starting nod.  Fluker started the season as third-string right tackle, but eventually redshirted his first year. In 2010, Fluker started nine games at right tackle. He missed three games with an injury midseason.

As a sophomore, Fluker started all 13 games for the Crimson Tide at right tackle on their way to the BCS National Championship victory over the LSU Tigers. As a junior, he started all 14 games at right tackle as Alabama repeated as BCS National Champions, this time against Notre Dame. He was selected Walter Camp and Associated Press second-team All-American and first-team All-SEC. He has graded out at 98.6 percent on blocking assignments. Since he had graduated and was in his fourth year, Fluker was granted eligibity by the National Football League to participate in the 2013 Senior Bowl.

Professional career

San Diego Chargers
The San Diego Chargers selected Fluker in the first round (11th overall) of the 2013 NFL Draft. He was the third of nine Crimson Tide players to be selected that year. He was the fourth Alabama offensive lineman selected in the first round within five years, after Andre Smith (2009), James Carpenter (2011), and Chance Warmack (2013).

During his rookie year, Fluker started in 15 games and was named to the All-Rookie Team. In the 2014 season, he started all sixteen games for the first time in his professional career. For the 2015 season, he moved from right tackle to right guard. In the 2015 season, he started in 12 games and recovered one fumble. He missed some time on the season due to a ankle injury. In the 2016 season, he started in all 16 games.

On March 7, 2017, Fluker was released by the Chargers, who had relocated to Los Angeles.

New York Giants
On March 11, 2017, Fluker signed a one-year, $3 million contract with the New York Giants. He played in nine games, starting six at right guard before hurting his toe in Week 11 against the Kansas City Chiefs. He was placed on injured reserve on November 27, 2017.

Seattle Seahawks
On March 20, 2018, Fluker was signed by the Seattle Seahawks. He played in 10 games, starting nine at right guard.

On March 14, 2019, Fluker signed a two-year, $9 million contract extension with the Seahawks. Fluker was released by the Seahawks on April 27, 2020.

Baltimore Ravens
On May 11, 2020, Fluker was signed by the Baltimore Ravens. He was placed on the reserve/COVID-19 list by the team on November 28, 2020, and activated two days later.

Miami Dolphins
Fluker signed with the Miami Dolphins on April 20, 2021. He was placed on injured reserve on July 29, 2021 after undergoing surgery for a torn meniscus. He was released on August 2, 2021.

Las Vegas Raiders
Fluker was suspended six weeks by the NFL on September 15, 2021, and reinstated on October 19. On October 20, 2021, Fluker was signed to the Las Vegas Raiders' practice squad. He was released on December 2, 2021.

Jacksonville Jaguars
On December 31, 2021, Fluker was signed to the Jacksonville Jaguars practice squad, but was released three days later.

References

External links

Alabama Crimson Tide bio
San Diego Chargers bio
New York Giants bio
Seattle Seahawks bio

1991 births
Living people
Players of American football from New Orleans
American football offensive tackles
American football offensive guards
Alabama Crimson Tide football players
San Diego Chargers players
New York Giants players
Seattle Seahawks players
Baltimore Ravens players
Miami Dolphins players
Las Vegas Raiders players
Jacksonville Jaguars players